Konstantin Nikolayevich Gusev (born 14 June 1971) is a former Russian football goalkeeper.

Club career
He made his debut in the Soviet Second League for FC Metallurg Novokuznetsk in 1989.

He played two seasons in the Russian Football National League for FC Metallurg Novokuznetsk and FC Kuzbass Kemerovo.

References

1971 births
Living people
Soviet footballers
Russian footballers
Association football goalkeepers
Russian expatriate footballers
Expatriate footballers in Azerbaijan
Neftçi PFK players
FC Novokuznetsk players
Azerbaijan Premier League players